Frank Bunker Gilbreth Jr. (March 17, 1911  –  February 18, 2001) was an American journalist and author. He co-authored, with his sister Ernestine, the autobiographical bestsellers Cheaper by the Dozen (1948; which was adapted as a 1950 film) and Belles on Their Toes (1950; which was adapted as a 1952 film). Under his own name, he wrote multiple additional books, such as Time Out for Happiness and Ancestors of the Dozen, and a long-running newspaper column.

Early life and education
Gilbreth was born in Plainfield, New Jersey, the fifth child (and first boy) of the 12 children born to efficiency experts Frank Bunker Gilbreth and Lillian Moller Gilbreth, and grew up in the family home in Montclair, New Jersey, where he attended Montclair High School. Gilbreth graduated from the University of Michigan, where he served as editor of the college newspaper, The Michigan Daily.

Career
During World War II, he served as a naval officer in the South Pacific, participated in three invasions in the Admiralty Islands and the Philippines, and was decorated with two air medals and a bronze star.

In 1947, he relocated to Charleston, South Carolina, where he returned to The Post and Courier (the city's main daily newspaper), as an editorial writer and columnist; under the nom de plume of Ashley Cooper, he wrote a long-running column, Doing the Charleston, which ran until 1993. He retired from The Post and Courier in 2001, as assistant publisher and vice president.

He and his older sister, Ernestine, wrote the bestselling books Cheaper by the Dozen (1948; adapted as a 1950 film) and its sequel Belles on Their Toes (1950; adapted as a 1952 film), which were largely autobiographical. On his own, he also wrote about fatherhood in the post-World War II "baby boom", and about family members.

Personal life
Gilbreth was married twice, to Elizabeth Cauthen (until her death in 1954), with whom he had a daughter (Elizabeth G. Cantler), and then to Mary Pringle Manigault (1955-2001), with whom he had two children (Dr. Edward M. Gilbreth and Rebecca G. Herres).

Death
Gilbreth died in 2001, aged 89, in Charleston, South Carolina, where he had lived for the preceding half century. At the time, he also maintained the family home in Nantucket, Massachusetts, which his father had bought in 1921.

Publications
Gilbreth's published books include:
 (with Ernestine Gilbreth Carey)
I'm a Lucky Guy, 1951 
 (with Ernestine Gilbreth Carey) 
Held's Angels, with John Held (illustrator), 1952 
Innside Nantucket, 1954 
Of Whales and Women, 1956 
How To Be a Father, 1958 
Loblolly, 1959
He's My Boy, 1962 
Time Out for Happiness, 1970 
Ashley Cooper's Doing the Charleston, 1993

References

Further reading

External links

 , comprehensive family and professional history.

1911 births
2001 deaths
20th-century American novelists
American male journalists
20th-century American journalists
American male novelists
United States Navy personnel of World War II
Military personnel from New Jersey
Montclair High School (New Jersey) alumni
People from Montclair, New Jersey
Writers from Plainfield, New Jersey
Writers from Charleston, South Carolina
United States Navy officers
University of Michigan alumni
20th-century American male writers
Novelists from New Jersey
Novelists from South Carolina
20th-century American non-fiction writers
The Michigan Daily alumni